Phragmoporthe is a genus of fungi in the Gnomoniaceae family. Species in the genus are found in Europe and North America.

References

External links
Phragmoporthe at Index Fungorum

Gnomoniaceae
Sordariomycetes genera